Michael Hulme (born 23 July 1960) is Professor of Human Geography in the Department of Geography at the University of Cambridge, and also a Fellow of Pembroke College, Cambridge.  He was formerly professor of Climate and Culture at King's College London (2013-2017) and of Climate Change in the School of Environmental Sciences at the University of East Anglia (UEA).

Early life and education
Mike Hulme attended Madras College secondary school from 1974 to 1978. He obtained a B.Sc. (Hons) in geography from the University of Durham in 1981 and a Ph.D. in applied climatology from the University of Wales, Swansea in 1985. His doctoral thesis was titled, Secular Climatic and Hydrological Change in Central Sudan.

Academic career
In 1988, after four years lecturing in geography at the University of Salford, he became for 12 years a senior researcher in the Climatic Research Unit, part of the School of Environmental Sciences at the University of East Anglia. In October 2000 he founded the Tyndall Centre for Climate Change Research, a distributed virtual network organisation headquartered at UEA, which he directed until July 2007.   Hulme served on the United Nations’ Intergovernmental Panel on Climate Change(IPCC) from 1995 to 2001. He also contributed to the 2nd and 3rd Assessment Reports of the IPCC, which was awarded the Nobel Peace Prize in 2007, for which Hulme received a personalised certificate acknowledging his contribution to the organisation.

He is the founding Editor-in-Chief (since 2008) of the review journal Wiley Interdisciplinary Reviews (WIREs) Climate Change, published by John Wiley & Sons.

In 2020, he became a signatory to the Great Barrington Declaration. The declaration, which called for an end to lockdowns during the COVID-19 pandemic, was sponsored by the American Institute for Economic Research, a libertarian free-market think tank associated with climate change denial.

Publications

He is best known as the author of Why We Disagree About Climate Change published in 2009 by Cambridge University Press and which was named by The Economist in December 2009 as one of their four Books of Year for science and technology.  He is also the author of Weathered: Cultures of Climate (SAGE, 2017),  Reducing the Future to Climate: a Story of Climate Determinism and Reductionism  (Osiris, 2011), and Can Science Fix Climate Change? A Case Against Climate Engineering (Polity, 2014).  He has edited the books Climates of the British Isles: Present, Past and Future, "Climate policy options post-2012: European strategy, technology and adaptation after Kyoto" co-edited with Bert Metz and Michael Grubb and in 2010, co-edited with Henry Neufeldt, Making Climate Change Work For Us: European Perspectives on Adaptation and Mitigation Strategies.  In 2013 he published Exploring Climate Change Through Science and in Society: An Anthology of Mike Hulme's Essays, Interviews and Speeches, which brings together many of his more popular writings on climate change since the late 1980s. In recent years he has edited the volume Contemporary Climate Change Debates: A Student Primer (Routledge, 2020) and is the author of Climate Change (Key Ideas in Geography) (Routledge, 2021).

Views about climate change

In 2008, Hulme made a personal statement on what he called the "5 lessons of climate change", as:

 "climate change is a relative risk, not an absolute one"
 "climate risks are serious, and we should seek to minimise them"
 "our world has huge unmet development needs"
 "our current energy portfolio is not sustainable"
 "massive and deliberate geo-engineering of the planet is a dubious practice"

After the Climatic Research Unit email controversy, he wrote an article for the BBC in which he said:

In another article for the BBC, in November 2006, he warned against the dangers of using alarmist language when communicating climate change science.

Mike Hulme is one of the authors of the Hartwell Paper, published by the London School of Economics in collaboration with the University of Oxford in May 2010. The authors argued that, after what they regard as the failure of the 2009 Copenhagen Climate Summit, the Kyoto Protocol crashed. They claimed that Kyoto had "failed to produce any discernible real world reductions in emissions of greenhouse gases in fifteen years." They argued that this failure opened an opportunity to set climate policy free from Kyoto and the paper advocates a controversial and piecemeal approach to decarbonization of the global economy.

Religious views 
Hulme is a self-proclaimed evangelical Christian, and member of the Church of England, who has been theologically influenced by the Fulcrum movement.

References 

1960 births
Academics of the University of Cambridge
Academics of King's College London
Academics of the University of East Anglia
Academics of the University of Salford
Alumni of Grey College, Durham
Alumni of Swansea University
British climatologists
English evangelicals
Living people
Non-fiction environmental writers
People educated at Madras College